Bolshakovo, or Bolshakovo-Novoye, a city in Slavsk District of Kaliningrad Oblast, Russia.

Bolshakovo (Russian: Большаково) may also refer to:

 Bolshakovo, Vladimir Oblast

See also
 Bolshakov, a surname